Swan River Airport  is located adjacent to Swan River, Manitoba, Canada.

Scheduled flights to Winnipeg were formerly provided by Keystone Air Service, which discontinued service some time between 2004 and 2005.

The airport has private charter services and emergency flights to Winnipeg.

References

External links
 Town of Swan River homepage

Certified airports in Manitoba